Piyadasi, Piyadassi (Pali) or Priyadarshi (Sanskrit) literally means "one who looks with kindness upon [everything]" (Sanskrit priya-darśin-, feminine priya-darśinī). It may refer to:

Priyadasi, an ancient Indian regnal name or honorific title, usually associated with Ashoka (304–232 BCE)
Piyadassi Maha Thera (1914–1998), Sri Lankan Buddhist preacher
Priyadarshi (actor) (born 1989), Indian actor and comedian in Telugu cinema
Priyadarshini (film), a 1978 Malayalam movie
Priyadarshini (singer), Indian playback singer
Priyadarshini Ram (born 1955), Indian Telugu filmmaker
Indira Priyadarshini Gandhi (1919-1984), Prime Minister of India
Tenzin Priyadarshi, Indian Buddhist leader